Kimwanyi is a neighborhood in Kira Municipality, Wakiso District, in the Buganda Region of Uganda. Kimwanyi also refers to Kimwanyi Parish, in Kira sub-county, Kyaddondo County, Wakiso District. It is one of the six parishes (wards) of Kira Municicipality, namely; Kimwanyi, Kira, Kyaliwajjala, Kireka, Bweyogerere and Kirinnya.

Location
Kimwanyi is in Kimwanyi Ward (Kimwanyi Parish), in northeastern Kira Municipality, Wakiso District, in Central Uganda. The Kimwanyi neighborhood is bordered by Nakweero to the north, Kijabijo to the northeast, Kitukutwe to the east, Kiwologoma to the southeast, Bulindo to the south, Gayaza to the west, and Manyangwa to the northwest. The coordinates of Kimwanyi are 0°27'12.0"N, 32°38'05.0"E (Latitude:0.453336; Longitude:32.634733).

Overview
Kimwanyi is a rural neighborhood. In 2001, a law was passed incorporating the village into the newly created Kira Municipality, the second-largest urban center in Uganda, with a population of 313,761 according to the 2014 national census.

The neighborhood is the location of Kimwanyi Umea Primary School, an elementary school, administered by the Uganda Muslim Community. Also located there is the Namugongo Youth and Women Development Association (YWDAN), a non-profit organization.

Population
In 2002, the national census estimated the population of Kira Municipality at 142,800. Kimwanyi Parish's population at the time was about 6,800 (approximately 5% of the total). In 2014, the Uganda Bureau of Statistics (UBOS), enumerated population of Kira at 313,761. Given that data, it is estimated that the population of Kimwanyi Parish (Kimwanyi Ward) in 2014, was about 15,700.

See also
 Bweyogerere
 Kirinnya
 Kireka
 Kyaliwajjala

References

External links
Project Report supported by Japan Water Forum Fund 2012

Populated places in Central Region, Uganda
Cities in the Great Rift Valley
Kira Town